Manuel Uribe Garza (11 June 1965 – 26 May 2014) was a Mexican man who suffered from morbid obesity to one of the greatest extents known in recorded history. However, he died in his hometown on 26 May 2014 weighing .

Uribe drew worldwide attention in January 2006, when he made an emotional plea on a Mexican television network that prompted both private and public assistance. He was also featured on The World's Heaviest Man, a 2007 television documentary about his bedridden life and attempts to overcome his obesity, and in The World's Heaviest Man Gets Married, a similar documentary that was broadcast in 2009 by the Discovery Channel.

Diet and weight loss 

Manuel Uribe returned to Mexico and eventually made an emotional plea for help on national television. The government appointed a group of doctors and certified nutritionists to help him lose weight, but while he turned down offers for gastric bypass surgery in Italy and Spain, he caught the attention of Barry Sears, the creator of the Zone diet. Sears prescribed him a diet high in protein and low in carbohydrates that consisted of five meals in small portions that included egg-white omelets, salads, chicken, fish, fruits and spring greens. His dramatic reduction in weight – reportedly  by February 2008 – prompted him to set his sights on a second Guinness World Record: "The World's Greatest Loser of Weight", which presumably was never certified.

Uribe tried to capitalize on his new-found fame by announcing plans to launch the Manuel Uribe Foundation, an institution aiming to educate Mexican people about nutrition and obesity, but the organization was never legally constituted. Garza, a former chef at a bowling alley who was unable to get out of his bed for four months, commented: "Manuel inspires me with courage and the will to live. I understand that this is a matter of life and death and that I have to follow the instructions that are given to me." Uribe's girlfriend Claudia Solís visited Garza's home with kiwifruit, grapefruit, pears, and protein supplements, and Uribe promised to help Garza get a wheel-equipped iron bed; however, Garza died five days later on 8 October 2008.

Second wedding 

On 26 October 2008, after four years together, Uribe – who weighed in at  after shedding  – married his second wife Claudia from his bed. He said: "I am proof you can find love in any circumstances. It's all a question of faith. I have a wife and will form a new family and live a happy life." He was transported to the civil wedding on his specially-reinforced four-poster bed, draped with cream and gold and adorned in bright sunflowers, on the back of a truck. Donning a white silk shirt with a sheet around his legs, he waited to greet Claudia as she walked down a flight of stairs wearing a strapless ivory dress and a tiara in front of over 400 guests.

Despite the publicity, his second marriage was short-lived and ended, according to Uribe's mother, some three-and-a-half years before his death in 2014.

Death 
Uribe was hospitalized on 2 May 2014 after suffering several cardiac arrhythmias and liver failure. He died on 26 May 2014 at age 48 from liver failure. After his death, his body was cremated and his ashes were buried at an undisclosed place in Monterrey.

See also 
List of heaviest people
Obesity

References

External links 

1965 births
2014 deaths
People from Monterrey
Obesity
Deaths from liver failure